The 2009 Supercheap Auto Bathurst 1000 was a motor race for V8 Supercars. It was the thirteenth running of the Australian 1000 race, first held after the organisational split over the Bathurst 1000 that occurred in 1997. It is the 52nd race tracing its lineage back to the 1960 Armstrong 500 held at Phillip Island.

The race, which was Race 18 of the 2009 V8 Supercar Championship Series, was held on 11 October 2009 at the Mount Panorama Circuit just outside Bathurst, New South Wales, Australia.

In the buildup to the race, much attention was focussed on defending champions Craig Lowndes and Jamie Whincup who had the chance with this race to become the second and third drivers to win the race four years in succession, a feat only ever achieved before by Bob Jane in 1964.

The race was won by Garth Tander, who recorded his second victory in the race, and by Will Davison, his scored his first win. It was also the sixth victory in the race for the Holden Racing Team.

Entry List
For the first time since 2004, teams from outside the V8 Supercar Championship Series would be allowed to compete. Three single car teams from the Fujitsu V8 Supercar Series were entered, bringing the entry list up to 32 cars. All six 'wildcard' drivers were debutants, along with Dean Fiore, Troy Bayliss, Ben Collins, Mark McNally, Tim Slade, James Thompson and David Wall. Of the 13 debutants, only Fiore, Assaillit, Douglas, Slade and Wall returned for future races. It was also the last Bathurst 1000 start for both Brad Jones and Leanne Tander.

*Entries with a grey background were wildcard entries which did not compete in the full championship season.

Driver changes
The only change in driver pairings from the 2009 L&H 500 was a swap in the Paul Morris Motorsport team with Owen Kelly moving into the #39 car with Russell Ingall, and Tim Slade joining Paul Morris in the #67 Commodore.

Practice 
Practice began on Thursday 8 October 2009. Alex Davison set the fastest time in the first session, a 2:09.7175. The second session saw Jason Richards lead the into the 'Eights' with a 2:08.6080. Jamie Whincup set the fastest time in the final session, quickest for the first day of practice, the defending champion recording a 2:07.3745 to be fastest by the big gap of six-tenths of a second in an ominous sign. Jason Bargwanna was second fastest, the only other driver to lap under 2:08 to be fastest Holden in the Tasman Motorsport Commodore. Steven Johnson was third quickest in the Dick Johnson Racing Falcon ahead of Mark Winterbottom in the Ford Performance Racing Falcon, Jason Richards, Alex Davison, Greg Murphy, Warren Luff completing the fastest two car team in the second Dick Johnson Racing Ford with Jason Bright and Fabian Coulthard completing the top ten.

Friday morning practice saw Lee Holdsworth lead the session, recording a 2:07.7376 ahead of Whincup the only other driver to get into the 'Sevens'. The second Friday morning session saw Steven Johnson record a 2:07.5702 to be fastest with Greg Murphy, Craig Lowndes, Mark Winterbottom, Alex Davison, Garth Tander forging into the Seven bracket. Jason Bright, Todd Kelly Jason Richards and Fabian Coulthard completed the top ten. Michael Caruso was disappointingly 26th. Best of the international drivers was the Anglo-Dane pairing of James Thompson and Allan Simonsen. Best of the driver who were not full-time V8 Supercar drivers was Steve Owen in eleventh.

An accident marred each of the two morning sessions, Andrew Fisher crashing the Sieders Racing Team Ford while in the second session Leanne Tander gave her Ford mainly cosmetic damage. Both cars were repaired for qualifying.

The Saturday morning warm-up session become embroiled in controversy when Mark Winterbottom was blamed for an on-track incident between himself and Sam Walter. Climbing Mountain Straight Winterbottom, weaving his car to warm his tyres, caused the much faster travelling Walter to lose control of his car avoiding the sudden movement of Winterbottom's car, resulting in a crash into the wall. The Greg Murphy Racing Commodore was extensively damaged and Walter suffered a broken toe. In his second fine of the weekend for this offence, Winterbottom was fined $15,000.

Qualifying 
Qualifying was held on Friday 9 October 2009. Qualifying was interrupted early when David Reynolds speared off the track at McPhillamy Park Corner before making a mess of the front end of the car against the barriers. Other than that were no surprises from the first qualifying session. The Triple F Racing Commodore of Dean Fiore and Troy Bayliss ended up three seconds slower than the rest of the qualifying field.

In the dying moments of qualifying Jason Richards set the fastest time 2:07.2230 with several leading competitors setting for last-ditch efforts, when Warren Luff spun into the sand trap at Murrays Corner bringing a premature end to qualifying and leaving Richards as the Provisional Pole Position winner.

Garth Tander was second fastest ahead of Lee Holdsworth as Holdens took the top three positions. Mark Winterbottom was the first Ford in fourth while Paul Dumbrell in fifth made Holden Racing Team the best performed team. Craig Lowndes followed with Shane van Gisbergen, Todd Kelly, Greg Murphy and Russell Ingall also progressing to the Top Ten Shootout on Saturday. In a major upset one of the pre-event favourites, the #17 Ford of Steven Johnson and James Courtney missed out, qualifying 13th, their last qualifying lap foiled by their teammates accident at Murrays Corner. Fabian Coulthard also missed the top ten in eleventh ahead of Jason Bright. After Johnson was Luff, who ended up as the fastest part-time V8 Supercar driver, with Jason Bargwanna and Greg Ritter following. Allan Simonsen was again best of the internationals in 17th.

Top Ten Shootout 
The Top Ten Shootout was held in damp and cold conditions on Saturday 10 October 2009. First out Russell Ingall was conservative and did not push the car on a drying track after heavy rain struck the earlier support races. Greg Murphy put down a time almost three seconds quicker, but was quickly disqualified for not getting his car in position to start the lap on time. It would have been good enough for seventh position. Todd Kelly was smooth as he could be, Shane van Gisbergen was ragged and fast. Craig Lowndes was six-tenths faster, setting a time that Paul Dumbrell speared off at the Chase trying to match. Mark Winterbottom missed Lowndes by hundredths and Lee Holdsworth was slower again before Garth Tander reeled off the only Seven of the session, a 2:07.9463 to take pole position. Jason Richards tried valiantly, but a couple of small slips dropped him to fifth position.

Race
The race began at 10:30am and the 161 laps were completed by 5:20pm (local time) Sunday 11 October 2009. The race began in wet conditions, Steven Richards won the start but quickly Will Davison climbed into the lead. At the first corner, Jason Bright spun after contact with Cameron McConville. Todd Kelly was the first to stop for slick tyres on lap 4, followed almost immediately by James Courtney. The next group saw Will Davison, Steven Richards and Craig Lowndes pit together. FPR's pitstop was slow and Lowndes leapt passed but there was contact between the two in the pits and Lowndes received a drive-through penalty.

David Sieders stopped at Hell Corner in what was the first retirement. The first round of pitstops began at lap 27 with the order Will Davison, Steven Richards, Courtney, Murphy, Ingall, Coulthard, Alex Davison and Todd Kelly, with Kelly first to pit again. The first front running car to strike trouble was Mark Winterbottom. During Richards' stint in the car the alternator failed and the battery was replaced at the first stop. The replacement battery came loose in the boot and flew across the car, hitting and cracking the refueling pipes causing a leak, then a fire.

Rain returned on lap 77. The second retirement was World Superbike champion Troy Bayliss who spun into the at the Dipper bringing out the safety car with the running order Davison, Murphy, Todd Kelly, Cameron McConville, Lowndes, Alex Davison and Courtney. Rain came again at the restart and Owen Kelly speared into the sand at Murrays Corner. Warren Luff hit the wall at the Dipper and limped back to the pits to retire. Rick Kelly was given the 'meatball' flag for dragging the car's rear undertray, loosened after contact with Warren Luff. Steven Johnson pitted with an engine problem but rejoined and the rash of lap 84 incidents concluded with Sam Walter crashing at Griffins Bend, the same point he had crashed in practice avoiding Mark Winterbottom.

The weather cleared up again soon after, however a safety car at lap 121 after Fabian Coulthard's Falcon stopped climbing Mountain Straight bunched up the field yet again. The running order prior to the safety car had seen David Besnard climb into the lead ahead of Todd Kelly, Murphy, Caruso, Luke Youlden and Tony Ricciardello. Steven Johnson pitted with broken front left corner, but would resume many laps down to collect some points for Johnson's impressive championship points run. The 888 car of Lowndes/Whincup fought back through the field and led the race around lap 130 before encountering a clutch problem after the safety car restart, which saw them drop back as far as fifth as Ritter climbed into the lead in an impressive driver between himself and David Besnard in the second GRM Commodore. The field was subsequently bunched up with several teams struggling to increase their fuel economy in preparation for the last round of pit stops.

Another safety car on lap 141 ruined many of the front-running cars final pit strategies, including Mark Skaife and Greg Ritter and bunched up the field yet again with 20 laps to go. Upon restart on lap 143, the HRT car number 2 of Garth Tander was issued a bad sportsmanship flag for a dangerous blocking incident which enabled them to retain the lead ahead of Rick Kelly in car number 7. On lap 148 the impressive run of Tony Ricciardello slowed with a spin on the restart. Within ten laps the car speared off at the Chase as well. From lap 148 onwards, the second placed car Rick Kelly lacked pace and began holding up Lee Holdsworth, Jason Bargwanna, Jamie Whincup and Jason Richards. Many passing moves followed - notably the move of Bargwanna on Holdsworth on lap 156, and then Whincup coming into contact with Bargwanna the following lap, turning Bargwanna around thus handing Richards third. Greg Murphy was making heaps of time on this group, and moved up to sixth following Bargwanna's spin.  This afforded the Tander a lead of around 4.5 seconds by lap 153, despite carrying the same pace to those behind him. Further down the field Allan Simonsen stopped and parked descending the hill, the races final retirement.

A crash at The Cutting for Nathan Pretty on lap 156 failed to bring out the safety car, despite depositing oil, glass and other debris on the track; however, Tony Ricciardello finding the Chase sand-trap on the following lap did, bunching up the field with only a couple of laps remaining. The restart on lap 159 saw a scramble for position behind the second placed Rick Kelly, acting as a buffer for Tander in the lead. Kelly was quickly passed by many of the front runners at the start of lap 160, releasing those caught behind to chase down Tander, with Jason Richards fighting into second to lead the chase however by this time, Tander had enough of a gap to retain the lead until the end of the race.

Lee Holdsworth recovered from an early spin the complete an all Holden podium with Greg Murphy and the best of the part-time drivers Mark Skaife, finishing fourth (and 0.004 seconds off a podium) ahead of the wounded Falcon of Whincup. Jason Bargwanna finished sixth completing a brilliant but largely unrewarded run for the Tasman Motorsport with both cars finishing in the top six but no podium. Tim Slade finished seventh in a good run in the second Supercheap Auto Commodore, with the Kelly brothers finishing eighth ahead of the cruelly unrewarded drive of the best all part-time V8 drivers, David Besnard and Greg Ritter. Tony D'Alberto and Andrew Thompson completed the top ten. Thirteen cars finished on the lead lap with 24 cars taking the chequer, last on the road James Courtney and Steven Johnson who lost 30 laps over their mechanical problems.

There was a total of eight safety car interventions throughout the race.

Results

Qualifying

Top ten shootout

Starting grid
The following table represents the final starting grid for the race on Sunday:

Race

Statistics
Provisional pole position: #8 Jason Richards - 2:07.2230
Pole position: #2 Garth Tander - 2:07.9463
Fastest race lap: #8 Jason Richards - 2:08.9972

Standings
After Race 18 of 26 races, the standings in the 2009 V8 Supercar Championship Series were as follows:

References

External links
Official website
Official timing and results
Official series website
2009 Supercheap Auto Bathurst 1000 images from www.motorsport.com

Supercheap Auto Bathurst 1000
Motorsport in Bathurst, New South Wales
October 2009 sports events in Australia